Otatso Lake is located in Glacier National Park, in the U. S. state of Montana. Otatso Lake is situated in a cirque below unnamed peaks in the northeastern section of Glacier National Park.

See also
 List of lakes in Glacier County, Montana

References

Lakes of Glacier National Park (U.S.)
Lakes of Glacier County, Montana